Reading Furnace Historic District is a national historic district located in Warwick Township and East Nantmeal Township, Chester County, Pennsylvania.

Reading Furnace was built in 1736 by iron pioneer William Branson, then later owned by his grandson, a prominent Iron works owner and American Revolutionary War officer, Samuel Van Leer. Branson also owned the nearby historical Warrenpoint House The furnace was a center of colonial iron making and is associated with the introduction of the Franklin Stove, and the retreat of George Washington's army following its defeat at the Battle of Brandywine, where they came for musket repairs. Nathanael Greene's company and Washington were both recorded encamping here. The location is listed as a temporary George Washington Headquarter. This furnace also supplied cannons and cannonballs for the Revolutionary Army.

The district includes 7 contributing buildings, 2 contributing sites, and 1 contributing structure with a former iron furnace and farm. The buildings are the mansion house, tenant house, barn, large shed, and three outbuildings.  The stone mansion was built in three sections between 1744 and 1936.  The latest addition was done under the direction of R. Brognard Okie. The contributing sites are the remains of an 18th-century dam and the foundation of the 1736 Reading Furnace.  The contributing structure is a stone arch bridge (1904).

It was added to the National Register of Historic Places in 1987.

See also
 National Register of Historic Places listings in northern Chester County, Pennsylvania
 List of Washington's Headquarters during the Revolutionary War

References

Historic districts on the National Register of Historic Places in Pennsylvania
Historic districts in Chester County, Pennsylvania
Van Leer family
National Register of Historic Places in Chester County, Pennsylvania